Constituency NA-267 (Kachhi) was a constituency for the National Assembly of Pakistan.

Election 2002 

General elections were held on 10 Oct 2002. Sardar Yar Muhammad Rind of National Alliance won by 57,751 votes.

Election 2008 

General elections were held on 18 Feb 2008. Mir Humayun Aziz Kurd an Independent candidate won by 61,249 votes.

Election 2013 

General elections were held on 11 May 2013. Khalid Hussain Magsi of PML-N won by 42,240 votes while his close rival, an independent, Abdul Raheem Rind received 38,000 votes. Magsi was disqualified by Supreme Court of Pakistan and re elections were ordered to be held on 28 April 2016.

Election 2016 
Khalid Hussain Magsi of Pakistan Muslim League (N) retained his seat in a by-election held on 28 April 2016 defeating Yar Muhammad Rind of Pakistan Tehreek-e-Insaaf. He secured over 35,000 votes compared to 23,000 votes of Rind. The voter turnout was 38%.

References

External links 
Election result's official website

NA-267
Abolished National Assembly Constituencies of Pakistan